Greymont is a suburb of Johannesburg, South Africa. Greymont is located quite close to both the University of Johannesburg as well as the University of the Witwatersrand, which means it has a rather large number of students living in this area. It is located in Region B of the City of Johannesburg Metropolitan Municipality.

History
The suburb was surveyed in 1903 and was part of Roodepoort but in February 1939, it became part of Johannesburg.

Culture and contemporary life
They have a vibrant and successful community initiative of revitalising the suburb. A variety of projects are active from clean-up projects to activities to bring them together, such as Yearly Spring Fairs and the Parkrun in the Alberts Farm Park.

Greymont even has a dedicated website showing their latest initiatives.

References

External links
 Greymont Website

Johannesburg Region B